Continue as a Guest is the upcoming ninth studio album by indie rock group the New Pornographers, scheduled for release on March 31, 2023.

Recording, release, and promotion
This is the band's first recording for Merge Records and was preceded by the singles "Really Really Light" on January 10, "Angelcover" on February 16, and "Pontius Pilate’s Home Movies" on March 7. On this album, principal songwriter A. C. Newman sought to expand the band's sound, incorporating both the polished pop music that they are known for as well as more "angular" and "almost abrasive" elements to their style.

Reception
In Under the Radar, Mark Redfern named "Angelcover" one of the top 10 songs of the week. The publication also listed "Pontius Pilate's Home Movies" once it was released a single.

Track listing
All songs written by A. C. Newman, except where noted
"Really Really Light" (Dan Bejar and Newman)
"Pontius Pilate’s Home Movies"
"Cat and Mouse with the Light"
"Last and Beautiful"
"Continue as a Guest"
"Bottle Episodes"
"Marie and the Undersea"
"Angelcover" – 3:31
"Firework in the Falling Snow" (Sadie Dupuis and Newman)
"Wish Automatic Suite"

Personnel
The New Pornographers
Neko Case
Kathryn Calder
John Collins
Todd Fancey
A. C. Newman
Joe Seiders

Additional musicians
Zach Djanikian – bass guitar, guitar, saxophone

See also
List of 2023 albums

References

External links
Press release from Merge Records

2023 albums
Merge Records albums
The New Pornographers albums
Upcoming albums